Gertraud Stemmler (4 November 1889 – 29 April 1972) was a German painter. Her work was part of the painting event in the art competition at the 1928 Summer Olympics.

References

1889 births
1972 deaths
20th-century German painters
German women painters
Olympic competitors in art competitions
People from Aschaffenburg
20th-century German women